Cirrhocephalina is a genus of moths of the family Crambidae.

Species
Cirrhocephalina brunneivena (Hampson, 1913)
Cirrhocephalina eucharisalis (Walker, 1859)
Cirrhocephalina evanidalis (Schaus, 1912)
Cirrhocephalina flaviceps (Hampson, 1918)
Cirrhocephalina venosa (Lederer, 1863)

References

Spilomelinae
Crambidae genera
Taxa named by Eugene G. Munroe